Richard Blake may refer to:

 Richard Blake (16th century), mayor of Galway, 1533–1534
 Richard Blake (17th century), mayor of Galway, fl. 1647
 Richard Blake Brown, British priest and author, 1902–1968
 Richard H. Blake (born 1975), American musical actor